Stuart Onslow Smith (born 6 February 1959) is an English actor from Winchester, Hampshire.

After studying acting and playing a few parts in Sydney, Australia, he moved to Hong Kong and starred in over 20 films in the 1980s, including "ninja" flicks by Godfrey Ho. He also worked extensively as a voice actor, dubbing Chinese films into English.

He is particularly popular among bad film fans due to his starring and co starring roles in IFD and Filmark ninja chop suey films.

He is now an actor and voice over artist based out of Sydney.

External links
Interview with Stuart Smith on Nanarland.com

1954 births
Living people
British expatriates in Australia
British expatriates in Hong Kong
British expatriates in Thailand
English male film actors
English male voice actors
Male actors from Hampshire
Actors from Winchester